Galiakhmetovo (Ğäliäxmät) is a rural locality (a selo) and the administrative centre of Akyulovsky Selsoviet, Khaybullinsky District, Bashkortostan, Russia. The population was 417 as of 2010. There are 8 streets.

Geography 
Galiakhmetovois located 61 km northwest of Akyar (the district's administrative centre) by road. Urazbayevo is the nearest rural locality.

References 

Rural localities in Khaybullinsky District